Ruše is a small settlement in the Municipality of Žalec in east-central Slovenia. The A1 motorway runs just north of the village. The area is part of the traditional region of Styria. The municipality is now included in the Savinja Statistical Region.

References

External links
Ruše at Geopedia

Populated places in the Municipality of Žalec